Aliens Ate My Homework is the first of a series of four books by Bruce Coville. The series is generally referred to as Bruce Coville's Alien Adventures or Rod Allbright's Alien Adventures. Aliens Ate My Homework was first published by Aladdin in 1993. A movie based on the book premiered on Netflix in 2018.

Film adaptation 
Aliens Ate My Homework is a film adaptation, directed by Sean McNamara. This film stars an ensemble cast, led by Jayden Greig, William Shatner, Dan Payne and Alex Zahara. The film premiered on Netflix on March 6, 2018, in the United States.

Other books in the series
I Left My Sneakers in Dimension X
The Search For Snout (UK title: Aliens Stole My Dad)
Aliens Stole My Body

References

External links 

 

1993 American novels
American science fiction novels
American children's novels
Children's science fiction novels
1993 children's books
American novels adapted into films
Novels by Bruce Coville
Novels about extraterrestrial life
Aladdin Paperbacks books